Nicholson House may refer to:

Nicholson House (Oyster Bay, Alabama), listed on the National Register of Historic Places (NRHP) in Baldwin County
Grace Nicholson Building, Pasadena, California, NRHP-listed in Los Angeles County
Dr. Malcolm Nicholson Farmhouse, Havana, Florida, NRHP-listed in Gadsden County
Nicholson-Rand House, near Indianapolis, Indiana, NRHP-listed in Marion County
George E. Nicholson House, Kansas City, Missouri, listed on the National Register of Historic Places in Jackson County
Shelby-Nicholson-Schindler House, Perryville, Missouri, NRHP-listed
Abel and Mary Nicholson House, Salem, New Jersey, NRHP-listed
Sarah and Samuel Nicholson House, Salem, New Jersey, NRHP-listed
James Nicholson House (Lakewood, Ohio), listed on the National Register of Historic Places in Cuyahoga County
Nicholson House and Inn, Erie, Pennsylvania, NRHP-listed
James Nicholson House (Charleston, South Carolina), NRHP-listed
Welch-Nicholson House and Mill Site, Houstonville, North Carolina, listed on the NRHP in Iredell County

See also
James Nicholson House (disambiguation)